Popelka can refer to:
Folklore
 the Czech name of Cinderella
Geography
 Lomnice nad Popelkou, a town in the Czech Republic, in the Liberec region 
 Nová Ves nad Popelkou, a village and municipality in the Czech Republic, in the Liberec region
People
 Anna Popelka, Austrian architect
 Augustin Popelka, Czech lawyer and politician
 Ernesto Popelka, Uruguayan cleric and former association football player
 Ferdinand Popelka, Austrian association football player
 Friedrich Popelka, Austrian historian
 Jiří Popelka, Czech volleyball player
 Josef Popelka, Czech organist
 Liselotte Popelka, Austrian art historian
 Popelka Biliánová, Czech writer
 Robert Popelka, former American football player
 Vladimír Popelka, former Czech cyclist